Peter Pope (fl. 1386), of Strood, Kent, was an English politician.

Pope was a Member of Parliament for the constituency of Rochester, Kent in 1386.

References

14th-century births
Year of death missing
People from Strood
English MPs 1386